Andrew Westoll is a Canadian writer, who won the 2012 Charles Taylor Prize for his non-fiction book The Chimps of Fauna Foundation: A Canadian Story of Resilience and Recovery.

A primatologist, Westoll previously published the travel memoir The Riverbones, about a year he spent studying capuchin monkeys in Suriname, in 2008. He is also a contributor to The Walrus, Explore, Outpost and The Globe and Mail. He won a Canadian National Magazine Award in 2007 for his Explore article "Somewhere Up a Jungle River", an article that grew into a book, The Riverbones.

In 2016, he published The Jungle South of the Mountain, his first novel.

Works
The Riverbones (2008)
The Chimps of Fauna Sanctuary (2011)
The Jungle South of the Mountain (2016)

Awards and honors
2012 Charles Taylor Prize for The Chimps of Fauna Sanctuary
2007 Gold National Magazine Award for "Somewhere Up a Jungle River"

References

External links
 
 

Canadian science writers
Canadian travel writers
Canadian male novelists
21st-century Canadian novelists
Living people
Year of birth missing (living people)
21st-century Canadian male writers
Canadian male non-fiction writers